The 755th Radar Squadron is an inactive United States Air Force unit. It was last assigned to the 34th Air Division, Aerospace Defense Command, stationed at Arlington Heights Air Force Station, Illinois. It was inactivated on 30 September 1969.

The unit was a General Surveillance Radar squadron providing for the air defense of the United States.

Lineage
 Constituted as the 755th Aircraft Control and Warning Squadron on 14 November 1950
 Activated on 27 November 1950
 Redesignated 755th Radar Squadron (SAGE), 15 October 1960
 Inactivated on 30 September 1969

Assignments
 541st Aircraft Control and Warning Group, 27 November 1950
 30th Air Division, 6 February 1952
 4706th Defense Wing, 16 February 1953
 37th Air Division, 8 July 1956
 Chicago Air Defense Sector, 1 June 1959
 20th Air Division, 1 April 1966
 30th Air Division, 1 December 1967
 34th Air Division, 1 July 1968 – 30 September 1969

Stations
 Elkhorn, Wisconsin, 1 January 1951
 Site redesignated Williams Bay AFS, Wisconsin, 1 December 1953
 Arlington Heights AFS, Illinois, 1 April 1960 - 30 September 1969

References

 Cornett, Lloyd H. and Johnson, Mildred W., A Handbook of Aerospace Defense Organization  1946 - 1980,  Office of History, Aerospace Defense Center, Peterson AFB, CO (1980).
 Winkler, David F. & Webster, Julie L., Searching the Skies, The Legacy of the United States Cold War Defense Radar Program,  US Army Construction Engineering Research Laboratories, Champaign, IL (1997).

External links

Radar squadrons of the United States Air Force
Aerospace Defense Command units